Mark N. Tompkins (born January 16, 1975) is a Canadian-born film and theater painter and scenic artist. His matte painting career began in the U.S. in 1999, when his name appears in numerous feature films, TV and games cinematics. He is best known for his scenic design sets and scenery in "I, Robot", "Fantastic Four", "Fifty Shades of Grey", "Godzilla" and many more.

Biography 
Tompkins was born in Vancouver, British Columbia. Before going to university, he was planning on becoming a child psychologist, but after his first job on a film set, he was hooked. In the following years, Tompkins worked on some pretty important features, such as I. Robot, the X- Men films and Fantastic Four. Once Canada's film and television production services started to decline, and more and more shows were being canceled, people like Tompkins had no other option but to look for a job outside the film and television industry.

For a short period of time, he worked in the building and renovation sector, painting walls in mansions and office spaces all around North Vancouver.

After that, he moved to Los Angeles where he took classes at the Art Center College of Design, while he was also working as a graphic artist, teaching classes and giving private lessons.
At the beginning, he was teaching painting classes to adults from his own studio, and later he started teaching children classes in parks and recreation sites. His painting style is influenced by a number of early Renaissance artists. He has also been inspired by artists like Andrew Wyeth and Maxfield Parrish.

Work 
Tompkins started his film career helping Steve Miner on his 1999 film Lake Placid, for which he was credited as a "project consultant."

References

External links 
 
 Mark N Tompkins at the Open Media DataBase

1975 births
Artists from Vancouver
Capilano University alumni
Canadian male film actors
Living people
Male actors from Vancouver